Eros (minor planet designation: (433) Eros), provisional designation  is a stony asteroid of the Amor group and the first discovered and second-largest near-Earth object. Visited by the NEAR Shoemaker space probe in 1998, it became the first asteroid ever studied from orbit around the asteroid.

The asteroid was discovered by German astronomer C.G. Witt at the Berlin Observatory on 13 August 1898 in an eccentric orbit between Mars and Earth. It was later named after Eros, a god from Greek mythology, the son of Aphrodite. He is identified with the planet Venus.

History

Discovery
Eros was discovered on 13 August 1898 by C.G. Witt at Berlin Urania Observatory and A. Charlois at Nice Observatory. Witt was taking a two-hour exposure of beta Aquarii to secure astrometric positions of asteroid 185 Eunike.

Name
Eros is named after the Greek god of love, Erōs. It is pronounced   or sometimes  . The rarely used adjectival form of the name is Erotian .

Eros was the first minor planet to be given a male name, on account of its orbit (it was the first near-Earth asteroid discovered).

Later studies
During the approach (opposition) of 1900–1901, a worldwide program was launched to make parallax measurements of Eros to determine the solar parallax (or distance to the Sun), with the results published in 1910 by A. Hinks of Cambridge and C.D. Perrine of the Lick Observatory, University of California. Perrine published progress reports in 1906 and 1908. He took 965 photographs with the Crossley Reflector and selected 525 for measurement. A similar program was then carried out, during a closer approach, in 1930–1931 by H.S. Jones. The value of the Astronomical Unit (roughly the Earth-Sun distance) obtained by this program was considered definitive until 1968, when radar and dynamical parallax methods started producing more precise measurements.

Eros was the first asteroid detected by the Arecibo Observatory's radar system.

Eros was one of the first asteroids visited by a spacecraft, the first one orbited, and the first one soft-landed on. NASA spacecraft NEAR Shoemaker entered orbit around Eros in 2000, and landed in 2001.

Mars-crosser
Eros is a Mars-crosser asteroid, the first known to come within the orbit of Mars. Objects in such an orbit can remain there for only a few hundred million years before the orbit is perturbed by gravitational interactions. Dynamical integrations suggest that Eros may evolve into an Earth-crosser within as short an interval as two million years, and has a roughly 50% chance of doing so over a time scale of ~ years. It is a potential Earth impactor, about five times larger than the impactor that created Chicxulub crater and led to the extinction of the non-avian dinosaurs.

NEAR Shoemaker survey and landing
The NEAR Shoemaker probe visited Eros twice, first with a brief flyby in 1998, and then by orbiting it in 2000, when it extensively photographed its surface. On 12 February 2001, at the end of its mission, it landed on the asteroid's surface using its maneuvering jets.

This was the first time a Near Earth asteroid was closely visited by a spacecraft.

Physical characteristics
Surface gravity depends on the distance from a spot on the surface to the center of a body's mass. Eros's surface gravity varies greatly because Eros is not a sphere but an elongated peanut-shaped object. Nighttime measurements fall near . Eros's density is 2.67 g/cm3, about the same as the density of Earth's crust. It rotates once every 5.27 hours.

NEAR scientists have found that most of the larger rocks strewn across Eros were ejected from a single crater in an impact approximately 1 billion years ago. (The crater involved was proposed to be named "Shoemaker", but is not recognized as such by the International Astronomical Union (IAU), and has been formally designated Charlois Regio.) This event may also be responsible for the 40 percent of the Erotian surface that is devoid of craters smaller than 0.5 kilometers across. It was originally thought that the debris thrown up by the collision filled in the smaller craters. An analysis of crater densities over the surface indicates that the areas with lower crater density are within 9 kilometers of the impact point. Some of the lower density areas were found on the opposite side of the asteroid but still within 9 kilometers.

It is theorized that seismic shockwaves propagate through the asteroid, shaking smaller craters into rubble. Since Eros is irregularly shaped, parts of the surface antipodal to the point of impact can be within 9 kilometres of the impact point (measured in a straight line through the asteroid) even though some intervening parts of the surface are more than 9 kilometres away in straight-line distance. A suitable analogy would be the distance from the top centre of a bun to the bottom centre as compared to the distance from the top centre to a point on the bun's circumference: top-to-bottom is a longer distance than top-to-periphery when measured along the surface but shorter than it in direct straight-line terms.

Compression from the same impact is believed to have created the thrust fault Hinks Dorsum.

Data from the Near Earth Asteroid Rendezvous spacecraft collected on Eros in December 1998 suggests that it could contain 20 billion tonnes of aluminum and similar amounts of metals that are rare on Earth, such as gold and platinum.

Visibility from Earth

During rare oppositions, every 81 years, such as in 1975 and 2056, Eros can reach a magnitude of +7.0, which is brighter than Neptune and brighter than any main-belt asteroid except 1 Ceres, 4 Vesta and, rarely, 2 Pallas and 7 Iris. Under this condition, the asteroid actually appears to stop, but unlike the normal condition for a body in heliocentric conjunction with Earth, its retrograde motion is very small. For example, in January and February 2137, it moves retrograde only 34 minutes in right ascension.

In popular culture 
In the novel and television series The Expanse, a catastrophic science experiment is unleashed on a civilian population living within tunnels cut through Eros.  This so-called "Eros Incident" ends with the asteroid mysteriously breaking its usual orbit and crashing into Venus.

It makes an appearance in the novel (and its film adaption) Ender's Game by Orson Scott Card, serving as a base for humanity.

In the Space Angel episode 'Visitors from Outer Space' (title text not quite matching narration), Scott McCloud and his crew are forced to destroy Eros by deflecting it into the Sun, after it becomes a hazard to spacecraft navigation.

Gallery

See also
 List of geological features on 433 Eros
 Lists of astronomical objects

Notes

References

Further reading

External links

 NEAR Shoemaker spacecraft
 NEAR image of the day archive
 The Subtle Colors of Eros
 The Color of Regolith
 Color View of the Saddle
 Creating Color Images of Eros
 Eros Color at Higher Resolution
 Eros' colors
 Eros in color
 Movie: NEAR Shoemaker spacecraft landing
 The Eros Project (OrbDev's attempts at litigation over their property claim)
 3D VRML 433 Eros Model
 3D shape model of Eros (requires WebGL)
 NEODys (saved output file from 2007) showing distance and magnitude Ephemerides for Eros during rare oppositions
 The Chicxulub Debate In relation to the K-T extinction.
 Dearborn Observatory Records, Northwestern University Archives, Evanston, Illinois Notations as to historical archived work on asteroid 433 Eros.
 Eros at Opposition in 2012 (Royal Astronomical Society of New Zealand)
 NEAR database by ASU (Image search) (Example)
 Eros nomenclature and Eros map with feature names from the USGS planetary nomenclature page
 
 
 

 
20120131
000433
18980813
Discoveries by Carl Gustav Witt
19981220
Named minor planets
20120131
000433
000433